The Super Aguri SA05 was the car with which the Super Aguri team competed in the first half of the  Formula One season. It originally was developed from the Arrows A23 designed in 2002 by Mike Coughlan and Sergio Rinland. The project was overseen by former Arrows engineer Mark Preston, who brought several other ex Arrows employees back with him.

The decision to use the A23 as the base chassis for the team's debut car was in part because the team was disallowed from using BAR's 2005 F1 car (BAR being Honda's predecessor team).

From the A23, the car used a new monocoque, new aerodynamic package and rear end engine parts. The original A23 used a V10 Cosworth engine, and thanks to the new engine regulations for 2006, the engine installation had to be redesigned to accept the smaller Honda V8.

The SA05 was driven by Takuma Sato, whose firing by the works Honda team had played a significant role in creating the team, and also was driven by inexperienced Japanese rookie Yuji Ide and long-term Renault test driver Franck Montagny.

The team was created at short notice, partly due to Honda's unwillingness to leave the popular Sato without an F1 drive. The team, led by former F1 driver Aguri Suzuki, was funded by Honda and used Honda engines. The gearbox was also from Arrows, as was the suspension design, which was unchanged from 2002.

The year was one of exploration and learning for the team. The car was predictably the slowest during pre-season testing, but a new aerodynamic package was introduced before the first race in Bahrain which brought the team closer to the others.  Although the car was on average the slowest, it was not by a big margin, and Sato impressed by racing with faster cars.  Ide, however, was out of his depth, and his Super Licence was taken away in part after a spectacular collision with Christijan Albers' Midland at the 2006 San Marino Grand Prix.  He was subsequently replaced by Montagny, who was much closer to Sato's pace.

The team's increase in personnel and support from Honda allowed them to prepare the SA06, which was used from the German GP onwards.  At that stage of the season, the team were unclassified in the Constructors' Championship, with no points.

The Super Aguri SA05 was the first non-Brackley Honda-powered F1 car since the Jordan EJ12.

Complete Formula One results
(key) (results in bold indicate pole position)

References

Super Aguri Formula One cars
2006 Formula One season cars